Winton is a hamlet in the Hambleton district of North Yorkshire, England.

Winton House, a farmhouse, to the west of the hamlet is a Grade II listed building.

References

External links

Villages in North Yorkshire